Dário António Marcelino (born 22 October 1992) is an Angolan cyclist, who currently rides for UCI Continental team .

Major results

2012
 National Road Championships
2nd Time trial
3rd Road race
2013
 3rd Road race, National Road Championships
2015
 National Road Championships
3rd Time trial
3rd Road race
2016
 1st  Road race, National Road Championships
2017
 National Road Championships
1st  Time trial
2nd Road race
 4th Overall Tour de Côte d'Ivoire
2018
 National Road Championships
1st  Time trial
2nd Road race
2019
 1st  Time trial, National Road Championships
 1st  Overall Tour du Faso
1st Stage 1 (TTT)

References

External links

1992 births
Living people
Angolan male cyclists